Karimama may refer to:

Karimama, Benin
Karimama, Burkina Faso